African Chinese are an ethnic group of Chinese with partial or total ancestry from any of the ethnic groups of Africa.

Notable people 

 Godfred Karikari
 Lou Jing
 Eddy Francis
 Ding Hui

See also 

 Africans in Guangzhou

Ethnic groups in China
African diaspora in China
People of African descent